Bryan Hall may refer to:

 Bryan Hall (sportscaster) (born 1934), Canadian radio presenter
 Bryan Hall (gridiron football) (born 1988), American football linebacker
 Bryan Hall (Gainesville, Florida), a historic building in Gainesville, Florida, United States
 Bryan Hall (Washington State University), a historic building in Pullman, Washington, United States

See also 
 Brian Hall (disambiguation)

Hall, Bryan